The Carris Trophy is the English Boys Under 18 Open Amateur Stroke-Play Championship. It was founded in 1935.

History
The event was founded as a boys' golf tournament in 1935 at the Moor Park Golf Club by Austin Carris. The competition was adopted in 1988 by the English Golf Union as the English Boys Under 18 Open Amateur Stroke-Play Championship. It is now played at various venues around England, but returns to Moor Park at five year intervals reflecting the inauguration of the trophy at this course.

Format
The championship is open to golfers of all nationalities in possession of a playing handicap not exceeding 1.4 under the CONGU Unified Handicapping System or a comparable scheme operated by a recognised overseas Golf Union, Federation or Association. Players must be under 18 at the start of the year in which the championship is played. It consists of 72 holes of stroke play over four days, 18 holes being played each day. After 36 holes, the leading 60 competitors and all those tying for 60th place play a further 36 holes over the next two days.

Winners

* – After a playoff

In 1935 the trophy was played over 18 holes. From 1936 to 1973 and in 1978 it was played over 36 holes. In 1965 it was reduced to 65 holes with only 29 holes being played on the first day after a delayed start because of snow and frost. In 1995 it was reduced to 66 holes by bad weather. In 2020 it was reduced to 36 holes by bad weather.

Source:

References

External links
Coverage at England Golf web site

Junior golf tournaments
Amateur golf tournaments in the United Kingdom
Golf tournaments in England
1935 establishments in England
Recurring sporting events established in 1935